Poivre Rouge ( in French) is a chain of restaurants in France owned by La Boucherie Group. Most locations are found in retail parks of the Les Mousquetaires, known as Les Marchés des Mousquetaires. Poivre Rouge was founded as Restaumarché in 1980 by Les Mousquetaires.

In 2005 it served 4.2 million meals.

In 2014 it was the sixth largest restaurant chain in France with 82 restaurants.

In July 2019, the La Boucherie group announced the acquisition of Poivre Rouge, which was completed in September 2019.

References

External links

Companies based in Pays de la Loire
French companies established in 1983
Restaurants established in 1983
Restaurant chains in France
2019 mergers and acquisitions